David Louis Pear (born June 1, 1953) is a former National Football League (NFL) football player. A defensive lineman, he was the first Tampa Bay Buccaneers player to be selected to the Pro Bowl and played in Super Bowl XV for the winning Oakland Raiders.  

Pear played college football at the University of Washington in Seattle under longtime head coach Jim Owens. He was selected in the third round of the 1975 NFL Draft by the Baltimore Colts, the 56th overall pick.

Through his football career, Pear suffered a number of injuries which required spinal surgery and hip replacement and have resulted in vertigo, memory loss, and speech impairment.

He has also been quoted saying, "Don't let your kids play football. Never."

See also
 Washington Huskies football statistical leaders

References

External links
Oakland Raiders – All-time roster – Dave Pear

1953 births
Living people
American football defensive tackles
Washington Huskies football players
Baltimore Colts players
Tampa Bay Buccaneers players
Oakland Raiders players
National Conference Pro Bowl players
Sportspeople from Vancouver, Washington